The Passionate Friends is a 1913 novel by H. G. Wells.

Plot summary

The protagonist is the novel's first-person narrator, Stephen Stratton.  The Passionate Friends is written as if addressed to Stephen's eldest son, who is on the verge of adolescence.  Stephen is the only child of a rector who loses his faith due to Darwinism.

The most important relationship of Stephen's life is with the Lady Mary Christian (later Lady Mary Justin), a beautiful blue-eyed contemporary who has been his childhood "playmate" and with whom he falls deeply in love at the age of nineteen during the summer before he begins his studies at Oxford.  Mary returns his love, but will not promise to marry Stephen.  Having resolved to "belong to myself," Mary weds Justin, a wealthy financier, but intends also to remain Stephen's intimate friend.

Stephen cannot accept this, breaks off relations, and experiences despair.  In an attempt to put his troubles behind him, Stephen volunteers to fight in South Africa, where the Second Boer War has just begun (1899).  He becomes an officer and distinguishes himself in the fighting, and also is exposed for the first time to "the social fundamental of Labor." Back in England he decides to pursue a political career, since his father has unexpectedly inherited a substantial fortune.  But by chance his father is now living on a property adjacent to Lady Mary Justin's; they meet and become lovers.

Stephen had begun to court another near neighbour, Rachel, but the resumption of his passionate relationship with Mary suspends this project.  Disaster strikes when Justin sees Stephen kiss his wife.  In the following crisis the powerful Justin hides Mary away in an Irish castle and prevails upon Stephen to leave England for a period of three years.

Traveling the world, Stephen studies Asian societies and develops convictions about the historical development of humanity.  He believes that "Civilization has never yet existed, it has only continually and obstinately attempted to be.  Our Civilization is but the indistinct twilight before the dawn." He resolves to devote himself to "the making of a new world-city, a new greater State above your legal States, in which all human life becomes a splendid enterprise, free and beautiful." In a villa on the Rhine he chances to meet Rachel again, and after a trip to America he asks her to become his wife; they are married on 8 November 1906. Stephen undertakes with a progressive American named Giddings a career as a publisher of world literature and reference books.

His work is going well when in 1909 Stephen receives a letter from Lady Mary Justin.  She asks him to resume writing to her, and over a period of two years challenges him to integrate the problem of sex into his world-historical reflections and plans, warning that "All this great world-state of your man's imagination is going to be wrecked by us if you ignore us, we women are going to be the Goths and Huns of another Decline and Fall." Their correspondence addresses personal as well as religious and political matters, but they have no intention of seeing each other again.

However, by chance they do meet again at an inn in the Alps on Engstlen Lake, below Titlis, and share several hours of spiritual communing; they scarcely touch and never kiss.  Stephen leaves promptly.  But Mary's companion betrays her to her husband, whose decision to divorce Mary after a trial for adultery threatens them both with social disaster.  To forestall this, Mary dies by suicide.  In his final remarks to his son, Stephen Stratton judges Mary to have been a victim "caught in the net of animal jealousies and thoughtless motives and ancient rigid institutions." He resolves, in the novel's final sentence:  "I give myself, and if I can I will give you, to the destruction of jealousy and of the forms and shelters and instruments of jealousy, both in my own self and in the thought and laws and usage of the world."

Composition

The narrator says that "The idea of writing such a book as this came to me first as I sat by the dead body of your grandfather." Wells's father, Joseph, died of heart failure on 14 October 1910, at the age of 82, and one biographer has noted that his death "neatly coincided with the end of his major period as a creative writer." Wells was attached to the notion that parents might become the "friends" of their adult children, and Stephen Stratton wonders:  "Why is it, I thought, that when a son has come to manhood he cannot take his father for a friend?" Much of the novel was written at the end of 1911.

The novel is mysteriously dedicated to "L. E. N. S.," possibly referring to Elizabeth von Arnim, whom Wells had nicknamed "little e" and who had become his lover late in 1910 and with whom he enjoyed assignations at her house, the Château Soleil, in the Alps, at the ski resort of Montana, Switzerland.

The Passionate Friends is also notable as the first introduction of Wells's notion of an "open conspiracy" of individuals to achieve a world state through an "open conspiracy against potentates and prejudices and all the separating powers of darkness."

Reception
The Passionate Friends was appreciated by Wells's friends Ford Madox Hueffer and Violet Hunt, and by Maurice Baring.  Reviews were largely positive.  Wells affected, in a letter to Henry James, to consider the novel "gawky" and to believe that "It has been thrust into the world too soon."

Work was begun on a stage version, but this did not come to fruition.  Two films have been made from the novel, one in 1922 and another in 1949.

The Passionate Friends was translated into Italian in 1914, into French in 1919, into Russian in 1924 and into Czech in 1928.  When it was republished in the Atlantic Edition of his collected works (1926), Wells appended three essays to it:  "Divorce," "The Endowment of Motherhood," and "The Great State."

External links

References

Novels by H. G. Wells
1913 British novels
British novels adapted into films